Stephen Baysted (born January 1969 in London, England), is a British composer of film, television and video game music. He is known for composing music for racing simulator video games.

Works 
Video games
GTR – FIA GT Racing Game (2005)
GT Legends (2005)
GTR 2 – FIA GT Racing Game (2006)
BMW M3 Challenge (2007)
Need for Speed: Shift (2009)
Shift 2: Unleashed (2011)
Skid Racer (2011)
Test Drive: Ferrari Racing Legends (2012)
Eager Beaver (2012)
The Walking Dead: Assault (2012)
Project CARS (2015)
Project CARS 2 (2017)
World of Speed (cancelled)
Fast & Furious: Crossroads (2020)
Project CARS 3 (2020)

Film and television
I, Claude Monet(Feature documentary)
Secrets of the Dead: Graveyard of the Giant Beasts(TV series)
Ancient Mysteries(TV series)
Renoir: Revered and Reviled(Feature documentary)
The Impressionists and the Man Who Made Them(Feature documentary)
War Dogs(Feature Film)
Strange Factories (Feature film)
Matisse: Live(Documentary)
Brandy and Pep(Short)
My Name is Georgina (Short)
Psycho House (Short)
Life Lines (Documentary)
 (TV movie)

References

External links 
 
 
Stephen Baysted at MobyGames
Air-Edel Associates
Accorder Music
University of Chichester
Stephen Baysted - SoundCloud

1969 births
Academics of the University of Chichester
Alumni of Falmouth University
Alumni of the University of Southampton
British film score composers
British male film score composers
Living people
Place of birth missing (living people)
Video game composers